Ust-Luga Multimodal Complex (Multimodalnyi kompleks Ust-Luga) is a project aimed at development of the portside area of about 3000 hectares located on the Soikinsky Peninsula by the Gulf of Finland in close proximity to the terminals of Ust-Luga Sea Merchant Port in Kingiseppsky District of Leningrad Oblast, Russia. The project developer is LLC "Multimodal complex Ust-Luga".

Proposed infrastructure
The development project of Ust-Luga Multimodal Complex envisages the following infrastructure: 
 an international cargo airport
 an industrial zone, a logistics zone, a temporary storage warehouses zone
 a business park
 a residential zone (intended for building)

Planning
Now OJSC "NIIP Gradostroitelstva" has completed the elaboration of an area planning scheme for Kingiseppsky district. This scheme determined the functional purpose of the project land. FSUE "RosNIPIUrbanistiki" completed  a Master Plan of the Vistinsky settlement. The Master Plan includes the location of Ust-Luga Multimodal Complex as well.
JSC "Lenaeroproject" made investigations and prepared a positive opinion on the technical possibility of constructing a cargo airport on the grounds of the Ust-Luga Multimodal Complex. The airport will be able to accommodate all types of cargo aircraft. Regulative bodies of the Leningrad region gave their approval to locate the cargo airport.

References

External links

Ports and harbours of Russia
Buildings and structures in Leningrad Oblast
Transport in Leningrad Oblast
Proposed buildings and structures in Russia
Proposed transport infrastructure in Russia